Hamilton Library can refer to the following libraries:

 Hamilton Library (Hawaii)
 Hamilton Public Library (Ontario), in Canada
 Hamilton City Libraries (New Zealand)
 Hamilton Library in Scotland, located at Hamilton Townhouse